The Evangelical Wesleyan Church, formerly known as the Evangelical Wesleyan Church of North America, is a Methodist denomination in the conservative holiness movement.

The formation of the Evangelical Wesleyan Church is a part of the history of Methodism in the United States; its creation was the result of a schism with the Free Methodist Church in 1963. In 1969, it merged with the Midwest Holiness Association, which had also left the Free Methodist Church.

The Evangelical Wesleyan Church was founded with a commitment to uphold the doctrine and standards of traditional Methodism. It has twenty-seven congregations.

The Church publishes a periodical known as The Earnest Christian and its seminary is the Evangelical Wesleyan Bible Institute (EWBI) in Cooperstown, Pennsylvania. Much of the denomination's literature is printed by LWD Publishing.

It holds a denomination-wide camp meeting at Summit Campground in Cooperstown, Pennsylvania and its General Conference at Camp Nysted in Nysted, Nebraska.

See also 

Fellowship of Independent Methodist Churches
Reformed Free Methodist Church

References

Further reading

Methodist denominations
Methodist denominations in North America
Holiness denominations
Holiness movement
History of Methodism in the United States
Christian organizations established in 1963
Evangelical denominations in North America
1963 establishments in the United States